Myriochila distinguenda is a species of tiger beetle found in South Asia. It is found mainly on the muddy shoreline around freshwater. The genus Myriochila is characterized by hooked setae on the femora and four hairs on the pale or whitish labrum.

References 

Cicindelidae
Insects described in 1825
Beetles of Asia